Sarah Elizabeth Hughes (born May 2, 1985) is a former American competitive figure skater. She is the 2002 Olympic Champion and the 2001 World bronze medalist in ladies' singles.

Personal life
Hughes was born in Great Neck, New York, a suburb on Long Island. Her father, John Hughes, was a Canadian of Irish descent and was one of the captains of the undefeated and untied NCAA champion 1969–70 Cornell University ice hockey team. Her mother, Amy Pastarnack, is Jewish and is a breast cancer survivor. This led Hughes to become an advocate for breast cancer awareness. She appeared in a commercial for General Electric promoting breast cancer awareness and research. Hughes stated: "I always said that if I can get one person to get a mammogram, I've accomplished something." Among the other causes Hughes supports are Figure Skating in Harlem, which provides free ice skating lessons and academic tutoring for girls in the Harlem community in New York City. Hughes has supported this program for over ten years.

Hughes attended Great Neck North High School. In 2003, she began her studies at Yale University where she was in Timothy Dwight College. On May 25, 2009, Hughes graduated from Yale and received a bachelor's degree in American studies with a concentration in U.S. politics and communities. She graduated from the University of Pennsylvania Law School on May 15, 2018.

Sarah Hughes is the fourth of six children. One of her younger sisters, Emily, is also a figure skater and competed at the 2006 Winter Olympics. She is the cousin of Gregg "Opie" Hughes, from the Opie and Anthony radio show.

Career
Hughes began skating at the age of three. Robin Wagner, who also choreographed for her from 1994, became her head coach in January 1998.

Hughes won the junior title at the 1998 U.S. Championships in the 1997–1998 season. The following season, she competed on the ISU Junior Grand Prix and won the silver medal at the 1998–1999 Junior Grand Prix Final. She also took silver at the 1999 World Junior Championships held in November 1998. At the 1999 U.S. Championships, Hughes won the pewter medal in her senior-level debut. As the fourth-place finisher, Hughes would not normally have received one of the three spots for U.S. ladies at the 1999 World Championships, however, Naomi Nari Nam, the silver medalist, was not age-eligible for the event according to ISU rules. Hughes was likewise not age-eligible, but at the time a loophole existed for skaters who had medaled at Junior Worlds. Hughes was sent to senior Worlds and finished 7th in her debut.

In the 1999–2000 season, Hughes made her Grand Prix debut, winning the bronze medal at the 1999 Trophée Lalique. She won the bronze medal at the 2000 U.S. Championships and was credited with a triple-salchow-triple-loop combination. She placed 5th at the 2000 World Championships.

In the 2000–2001 season, Hughes won three medals on the Grand Prix circuit and won the bronze medal at the 2000–2001 Grand Prix of Figure Skating Final. She won the silver medal at the 2001 U.S. Championships. At the 2001 World Championships, she won the bronze medal.

In the 2001–2002 season, Hughes again competed on the Grand Prix, winning the 2001 Skate Canada International while placing second at her other two events. She won her second consecutive bronze medal at the Grand Prix Final and won the bronze medal at the 2002 U.S. Championships to qualify for the 2002 Winter Olympics.

The week before the opening of the 2002 Olympics, Hughes appeared on the cover of Time magazine.

At the 2002 Olympics, Hughes won the gold medal in what was widely considered one of the biggest upsets in figure skating history. She was the youngest skater in the competition, and was not expected to seriously challenge the favorites, teammate Michelle Kwan and Russia's Irina Slutskaya. Hughes became the first woman in Olympic history to land two triple jump-triple jump combinations in a 4-minute free skate. Kwan, Slutskaya, and Sasha Cohen (the three skaters that finished ahead of Hughes in the short program), all made significant mistakes in the free skate, clearing the way for Hughes to win gold.

After her Olympic win, Hughes was honored with a parade in her hometown of Great Neck. Senator Hillary Clinton spoke at the event and declared it Sarah Hughes Day. She received the James E. Sullivan Award as the top amateur athlete in the U.S. She became the third figure skater to win this award after Dick Button (1949) and Michelle Kwan (2001).

Hughes did not compete at the 2002 World Championships. In the 2002–2003 season, she won the silver medal at the 2003 U.S. Championships and placed sixth at the 2003 World Championships.

Hughes took the 2004–2005 year off from college and skated professionally with the Smuckers Stars on Ice tour company. She was inducted into the International Jewish Sports Hall of Fame in 2005.

Richard Krawiec wrote a biography about her, Sudden Champion: The Sarah Hughes Story (2002).

Skating technique
Hughes employed a variety of triple-triple jump combinations, including a triple loop-triple loop, triple salchow-triple loop, and a triple toe-triple loop. Her best jump was perhaps the triple loop which she often completed out of and following a back spiral. She was known for her camel spin with a change of edge as well as her spiral position. Unlike most skaters, she executed jumps and spins clockwise.

Programs

Results
GP: Grand Prix; JGP: Junior Grand Prix

See also
 List of notable Jewish figure skaters

References

External links

 
 
 
 

American female single skaters
American people of Canadian descent
Figure skaters at the 2002 Winter Olympics
American people of Irish descent
James E. Sullivan Award recipients
Jewish American sportspeople
Olympic figure skaters of the United States
Olympic gold medalists for the United States in figure skating
People from Great Neck, New York
Yale University alumni
Timothy Dwight College alumni
1985 births
Living people
Sportspeople from New York (state)
World Figure Skating Championships medalists
World Junior Figure Skating Championships medalists
Medalists at the 2002 Winter Olympics
Great Neck North High School alumni
University of Pennsylvania Law School alumni
21st-century American Jews
21st-century American women